Cari and Jemele Won't Stick to Sports (stylized as Cari & Jemele (won't) Stick to Sports) is an American talk show hosted by Jemele Hill and Cari Champion. The show aired Vice TV from August 19, 2020 to February 4, 2021, for 18 episodes. In the show, Hill and Champion would discuss social issues, sports activism, business, and pop culture. The show's name was derived from the commonly used 'stick to sports' phrase in pushback against the argument that athletes and sports journalists should not publicly share their political beliefs.

The show hosted guests such as Magic Johnson, Mark Cuban, Steve Austin, Cory Booker, and LeBron James.

References

2020 American television series debuts
2020s American television talk shows
American sports television series
English-language television shows
Viceland original programming